Never Hear the End of It is the eighth album by Canadian rock band Sloan. The record's first single was "Who Taught You to Live Like That?", while "Ill-Placed Trust" was launched as a second single in November. The album debuted at #29 on the Canadian Albums Chart and peaked at #48 on the Billboard Heatseekers chart, making it the band's first album to chart in the U.S.

The CD release of the album included all 30 songs contained on a single disc, while vinyl pressings were issued as a double LP. At 76 minutes and 26 seconds, it boasts the longest running time of Sloan's studio albums—exceeded only by the 4 Nights at the Palais Royale live double album.

A video for the track "I've Gotta Try" was also released and charted on Canada's MuchMoreMusic.

The song "Flying High Again" was used in a 2007 episode of America's Funniest Home Videos in a montage of hang gliding accidents.

Track listing

References 

2006 albums
Sloan (band) albums